9th AFCA Awards

Best Film: 
Her

The 9th Austin Film Critics Association Awards, honoring the best in filmmaking for 2013, were announced on December 17, 2013.

Top 10 Films 
 Her
 12 Years a Slave
 Gravity
 The Wolf of Wall Street
 Inside Llewyn Davis
 Short Term 12
 Mud
 Before Midnight
 Dallas Buyers Club
 Captain Phillips

Winners
 Best Film:
 Her
 Best Director:
 Alfonso Cuarón – Gravity
 Best Actor:
 Chiwetel Ejiofor – 12 Years a Slave
 Best Actress:
 Brie Larson – Short Term 12
 Best Supporting Actor:
 Jared Leto – Dallas Buyers Club
 Best Supporting Actress:
 Lupita Nyong'o – 12 Years a Slave
 Best Original Screenplay:
 Her – Spike Jonze
 Best Adapted Screenplay:
 12 Years a Slave – John Ridley
 Best Cinematography:
 Gravity – Emmanuel Lubezki
 Best Original Score:
 Her – Arcade Fire
 Best Foreign Language Film:
 Blue Is the Warmest Colour • France
 Best Documentary:
 The Act of Killing
 Best Animated Feature:
 Frozen
 Best First Film:
 Ryan Coogler – Fruitvale Station
 Breakthrough Artist Award:
 Brie Larson – Short Term 12
 Austin Film Award:
 Before Midnight – Richard Linklater
 Special Honorary Award:
 Scarlett Johansson for her outstanding voice performance in Her

References

External links
 IMDb page

2013 film awards
2013
2013 in Texas